Claude Schnell (born May 17, 1955) is an American keyboardist who has been a member of the bands Magic, Rough Cutt, Dio, and Last in Line.

Biography 
Born in Brooklyn, New York, and raised in France, when he was six years old his family moved back to New York, and Schnell immersed himself in the traditional classical piano curriculum of private lessons, practice and recitals.

As he was growing up, with the impact of artists like Jimi Hendrix playing in the Village, Humble Pie at the Fillmore and Zeppelin at Madison Square Garden, Schnell discovered rock and roll. He maintained the discipline of his Classical studies, he also began playing in a wide assortment of bands.

Schnell left New York City to spend several years in Buffalo where more long-term musical friendships were forged, most notably with bass players Billy Sheehan and Joe Cristofanilli, and drummer Pete O'Donnell.

Upon arriving in Los Angeles in the early 1980s, it was not long before Schnell's virtuoso talents were in high demand. He formed two promising bands, Magic and Rough Cutt.

By 1983, Schnell's musical diligence and precision had earned him a reputation as one of L.A.'s most serious and well-respected players. Schnell joined Dio in May 1983. Schnell first played with Dio on the Holy Diver tour, though he did not play on the album itself.

After almost seven years in that band, Schnell chose to redefine his artistic focus, and embark upon his own musical odyssey.

Discography

Dio
 The Last in Line (1984)
 Sacred Heart (1985)
 Intermission (1986)
 Dream Evil (1987)

 Others 
 1983 - Rough Cutt – Hollywood Hottest Unsigned Rock Bands (compilation)
 1985 - Y&T – Down for the Count 1985 - Mark Edwards – Code of Honor 1989 - Loudness – Soldier of Fortune 1989 - Doro – Force Majeure 1993 - Impellitteri – Victim of the System 1993 - Gary Hoey – Animal Instinct 2003 - Neil Turbin – Threatcon Delta''

Notes

External links

Claude Schnell

Rough Cutt members
Dio (band) members
Living people
American rock keyboardists
American heavy metal keyboardists
American expatriates in France
1955 births
Impellitteri members
20th-century American keyboardists